La Unión Airport  is an airport serving the town of La Unión in Olancho Department, Honduras.

There is high terrain west through northeast of the airport, with a hill immediately north of the runway.

See also

Transport in Honduras
List of airports in Honduras

References

External links
OpenStreetMap - La Unión
HERE Maps - La Unión
OurAirports - Carta Airport
SkyVector Aeronautical Charts - Carta

Airports in Honduras